Tatiana Grindenko (born 1946) is a Russian violinist and Meritorious Artist who graduated from the Moscow Conservatory and then became an assistant to Yuri Yankelevich. She is a founder of Grindenko Ensemble and currently works as a soloist there. She has appeared on stage along such conductors as Frans Brüggen, Kurt Masur, Kurt Sanderling, M. Rostropovich, Gidon Kremer, G. Rozhdestvensky, K. Kondrashin and Yuri Temirkanov as well as various pianists and violinists such as A. Lubimov and A. Kniazev. Her CDs were published under such labels as Melodiya, Ondine, Deutsche Grammophon, Long Arms Records, and many others. She is also known for her performance in operas such as The Magic Flute which was directed by Katya Pospelova, Mozart and Salieri, and Go and Stop Progress of Anatoly Vasiliev and Yuri Lyubimov, and llya Applebaum's Orpheus.

References

1946 births
Living people
Russian violinists
Russian classical violinists
Moscow Conservatory alumni
Honored Artists of the Russian Federation
Women classical violinists
21st-century classical violinists
21st-century women musicians